UFC 279: Diaz vs. Ferguson was a mixed martial arts event produced by the Ultimate Fighting Championship that took place on September 10, 2022, at the T-Mobile Arena in Paradise, Nevada, part of the Las Vegas Metropolitan Area, United States.

Background
The promotion originally targeted a UFC Bantamweight Championship bout between current champion Aljamain Sterling and former two-time champion T.J. Dillashaw as the main event, but opted to change plans and move it to UFC 280.

A welterweight bout between Khamzat Chimaev and former lightweight title challenger (also The Ultimate Fighter 5 lightweight winner) Nate Diaz was originally expected to headline the event. However at the weigh-ins, Chimaev weighed in at 178.5 pounds, 7.5 pounds over the welterweight non-title limit and the bout was cancelled. As a result, the organization opted to shuffle a trio of fights: a new main event featuring Diaz against former interim UFC Lightweight Champion (also The Ultimate Fighter: Team Lesnar vs. Team dos Santos welterweight winner) Tony Ferguson, who was originally scheduled to face Li Jingliang in a welterweight bout, was then set. In addition, Chimaev was instead matched up with Kevin Holland, who was originally scheduled to face Daniel Rodriguez at a catchweight of 180 pounds, though the new matchup would be a five round bout (Chimaev wasn't fined due to the new booking). Finally, Rodriguez and Jingliang were matched up at a catchweight of 180 pounds. 

A trio of bouts was originally scheduled for this date, but they were eventually pushed back a week to UFC Fight Night: Sandhagen vs. Song as the promotion adjusted its schedule in June: lightweight bouts featuring Trey Ogden vs. Daniel Zellhuber and Nikolas Motta vs. Cameron VanCamp; as well as a welterweight bout between Louis Cosce and Trevin Giles.

A women's strawweight bout between Hannah Cifers and Melissa Martinez was expected to take place at the event. However, Cifers pulled out due to undisclosed reasons and was replaced by Elise Reed.

A middleweight bout between Jamie Pickett and Denis Tiuliulin was expected to take place at UFC on ESPN: dos Anjos vs. Fiziev, but it was moved to this card due to Tiuliulin suffering an injury during the week of the fight.

A heavyweight bout between Shamil Abdurakhimov and Jailton Almeida was expected to take place at the event. However, Abdurakhimov was forced to withdraw due to visa issues and was replaced by Anton Turkalj at a catchweight of 220 pounds.

The organization usually holds a pre-fight press-conference two days before numbered events, but this edition's was cancelled mid section. All fighters in the last three bouts of the event were expected to participate, however after a lengthy delay, UFC President Dana White showed up only with Holland and Rodriguez. He announced that fighters would be brought in pairs, but cancelled the press-conference after their participation instead for "everybody's safety". He later revealed that an altercation involving four fighters and their teams took place backstage. It initiated with Chimaev and Holland, with Diaz eventually getting involved. The Nevada Athletic Commission (NAC) is expected to investigate the incident and potentially discipline all licensees. 

In addition to Chimaev missing weight, featherweight Hakeem Dawodu and heavyweight Chris Barnett both missed weight as well. Dawodu weighed at 149.5 pounds, 3.5 pounds over the non-title featherweight limit, while Barnett weighed in at 267.5 pounds, 1.5 pounds over the non-title heavyweight limit. Both bouts proceeded at catchweight with Dawodu and Barnett each fined 30% and 20% of their purses, which went to their opponents Julian Erosa and Jake Collier respectively. A women's bantamweight bout between Irene Aldana and The Ultimate Fighter: Heavy Hitters women's featherweight winner Macy Chiasson was also changed to a 140-pound catchweight bout, but it was not due to a weight miss.

Results

Bonus awards 
The following fighters received $50,000 bonuses.
 Fight of the Night: No bonus awarded.
 Performance of the Night: Nate Diaz, Irene Aldana, Johnny Walker, and Jailton Almeida

See also 

 List of UFC events
 List of current UFC fighters
 2022 in UFC

References 

Ultimate Fighting Championship events
2022 in mixed martial arts
September 2022 sports events in the United States
Mixed martial arts in Las Vegas
Sports competitions in Las Vegas
Events in Paradise, Nevada